The Latifur Rahman Cabinet led the Caretaker government of Bangladesh from 15 July 2001  to 10 October 2001.

List of Advisors

References

Cabinets of Bangladesh
Cabinets established in 2001